William R. Crow (born December 9, 1940) is an American former professional basketball player who spent one season in the American Basketball Association (ABA) with the Anaheim Amigos during the 1967–68 season. He attended Cerritos College, Brigham Young University and Westminster College of Utah. In 1961, he was an all-Western State Conference honorable mention.

References

External links
 

1940 births
Living people
American men's basketball players
Anaheim Amigos players
Basketball players from California
BYU Cougars men's basketball players
Cerritos Falcons men's basketball players
Westminster Griffins men's basketball players